Narcosis is a 2022 Dutch drama film directed and co-written by Martijn de Jong. The film won 3 Golden Calf.

References

External links 

 

2022 films
Dutch drama films
2020s Dutch-language films
2022 drama films